Kesklinn (Estonian for "City centre") is one of the 8 administrative districts of Tallinn, the capital of Estonia. It is situated on the Tallinn Bay and bordered to the northwest by the district of Põhja-Tallinn, to the west by Kristiine, to the southwest by Nõmme, to the east by Lasnamäe and Pirita, and to the south by Rae Parish, beyond Lake Ülemiste. The island of Aegna, located in the Tallinn Bay, also falls within this administrative district.

It is home to Tallinn's UNESCO-listed Old Town. Here sits the Tallinn Passenger Port and port-related business centres, including a new complex of high-rise buildings on Liivalaia Street, as well as Tartu Road and Maakri Street. Most of the city's public and cultural venues are located in Kesklinn. These include the parliament building (Toompea Castle), City Government, The Estonian National Opera, Estonian and Russian drama theatres, The National Library, Kadrioru and Kalevi stadiums and a considerable number of museums, theatres and government agencies. Real estate costs in the area are the highest in Estonia. While the population of the city and the country as a whole have fallen since independence, the population of Kesklinn has risen. One of the economy's key drivers is tourism from Helsinki, Finland, which is connected to Tallinn by rapid ferry traffic.

Outside old town, there are a number of sights including Kadriorg Palace in Kadriorg, a Baroque building which was built in the 18th century by Peter I of Russia. Here also is the location of the Rotermanni quarter, Tatari, Kassisaba subdistricts. Until April 2007, a bronze Soviet war monument commemorated the occupation of Estonia by the Soviet Union; however this statue was relocated, sparking protests throughout the country's vocal Russian minority and abroad. This part of the city is home to 42 parks, including Kadriorg Park, Toompark, Hirvepark, and Tammsaare Park. The coastline gulf stretches from the Linnahall to a memorial of Maarjamäe.

Kesklinn has 21 subdistricts: Aegna, Juhkentali, Kadriorg, Kassisaba, Keldrimäe, Kitseküla, Kompassi, Luite, Maakri, Mõigu, Raua, Sadama, Sibulaküla, Südalinn, Tatari, Tõnismäe, Torupilli, Ülemistejärve, Uus Maailm, Vanalinn and Veerenni.

Population

Kesklinn has a population of 57,731.

Headquarters located in Kesklinn 
This list/table lists headquarters located in Kesklinn, Tallinn, Estonia.

References

External links

 
Districts of Tallinn